Saint-Aubin (French for "Saint Albinus") may refer to:

People

 Charles Germain de Saint Aubin (1721 – 1786), French draftsman and embroidery designer to King Louis XV
 Gabriel de Saint-Aubin (1724 – 1780), French draftsman, printmaker, etcher and painter
 Helen Callaghan St. Aubin (1923 – 1992), American baseball player
 Lisa St Aubin de Terán (b. 1953), English novelist
 Edward St Aubyn (b. 1960), English novelist

Places

France
Château Saint-Aubin, in the Gironde  département 
Saint-Aubin, Aisne, in the Aisne  département 
Saint-Aubin, Aube, in the Aube  département 
Saint-Aubin, Côte-d'Or, in the Côte-d'Or  département 
Saint-Aubin, Essonne, in the Essonne  département
Saint-Aubin, Indre, in the Indre  département 
Saint-Aubin, Jura, in the Jura  département 
Saint-Aubin, Landes, in the Landes département 
Saint-Aubin, Lot-et-Garonne, in the Lot-et-Garonne  département 
Saint-Aubin, Nord, in the Nord  département 
Saint-Aubin, Pas-de-Calais, in the Pas-de-Calais  département
Saint-Aubin-Celloville, in the Seine-Maritime  département
Saint-Aubin-Château-Neuf, in the Yonne  département 
Saint-Aubin-d'Appenai, in the Orne  département 
Saint-Aubin-d'Arquenay, in the Calvados  département 
Saint-Aubin-d'Aubigné, in the Ille-et-Vilaine  département 
Saint-Aubin-de-Blaye, in the Gironde  département 
Saint-Aubin-de-Bonneval, in the Orne  département 
Saint-Aubin-de-Branne, in the Gironde  département 
Saint-Aubin-de-Cadelech, in the Dordogne  département 
Saint-Aubin-de-Courteraie, in the Orne  département 
Saint-Aubin-de-Crétot, in the Seine-Maritime département 
Saint-Aubin-d'Écrosville, in the Eure  département
Saint-Aubin-de-Lanquais, in the Dordogne  département 
Saint-Aubin-de-Locquenay, in the Sarthe  département 
Saint-Aubin-de-Luigné, in the Maine-et-Loire  département 
Saint-Aubin-de-Médoc, in the Gironde  département 
Saint-Aubin-de-Nabirat, in the Dordogne  département 
Saint-Aubin-des-Bois, Calvados, in the Calvados  département
Saint-Aubin-des-Bois, Eure-et-Loir, in the Eure-et-Loir  département 
Saint-Aubin-de-Scellon, in the Eure  département 
Saint-Aubin-des-Landes, in the Ille-et-Vilaine  département
Saint-Aubin-des-Ormeaux, in the Vendée  département 
Saint-Aubin-des-Préaux, in the Manche  département 
Saint-Aubin-de-Terregatte, in the Manche  département 
Saint-Aubin-du-Cormier, in the Ille-et-Vilaine  département 
Saint-Aubin-du-Désert, in the Mayenne  département 
Saint-Aubin-du-Pavail, in the Ille-et-Vilaine  département 
Saint-Aubin-du-Perron, in the Manche  département
 Saint-Aubin-du-Plain, in the Deux-Sèvres département 
 Saint-Aubin-du-Thenney, in the Eure département 
 Saint-Aubin-en-Bray, in the Oise département 
 Saint-Aubin-en-Charollais, in the Saône-et-Loire département 
 Saint-Aubin-Épinay, in the Seine-Maritime département 
 Saint-Aubin-Fosse-Louvain, in the Mayenne département 
 Saint-Aubin-la-Plaine, in the Vendée département 
 Saint-Aubin-le-Cauf, in the Seine-Maritime département 
 Saint-Aubin-le-Cloud, in the s Deux-Sèvres département 
 Saint-Aubin-le-Dépeint, in the Indre-et-Loire département 
 Saint-Aubin-le-Guichard, in the Eure département 
 Saint-Aubin-le-Monial, in the Allier département 
 Saint-Aubin-lès-Elbeuf, in the a Seine-Maritime département 
 Saint-Aubin-les-Forges, in the Nièvre département 
 Saint-Aubin-le-Vertueux, in the Eure département 
 Saint-Aubin-Montenoy, in the Somme département 
 Saint-Aubin-Rivière, in the Somme département 
 Saint-Aubin-Routot, in the Seine-Maritime département 
 Saint-Aubin-sous-Erquery, in the Oise département 
 Saint-Aubin-sur-Aire, in the Meuse département 
 Saint-Aubin-sur-Gaillon, in the Eure département 
 Saint-Aubin-sur-Loire, in the  Saône-et-Loire département 
 Saint-Aubin-sur-Mer, Seine-Maritime, in the Seine-Maritime département 
 Saint-Aubin-sur-Mer, Calvados, in the Calvados département 
 Saint-Aubin-sur-Quillebeuf, in the Eure département 
 Saint-Aubin-sur-Scie, in the Seine-Maritime département 
 Saint-Aubin-sur-Yonne, in the Yonne département

Jersey
Saint Aubin, Jersey in the parish of St Brélade
 St Aubin railway station

Mauritius
Saint Aubin, Mauritius, a village in the district of Savanne, Mauritius

Switzerland
 Saint Aubin, Fribourg, in the Canton of Fribourg
 Saint-Aubin-Sauges, in the Canton of Neuchâtel

Other uses 
Basilica of San Albino, Mesilla, New Mexico, U.S.A.
 Saint-Aubin wine, from the commune of Saint-Aubin, Côte-d'Or